The 2016 Kennesaw State Owls football team represented Kennesaw State University in the 2016 NCAA Division I FCS football season. They were led by second-year head coach Brian Bohannon and played their home games at Fifth Third Bank Stadium. They were second-year members of the Big South Conference. This season was the Owls second season of intercollegiate football. They finished the season 8–3, 3–2 in Big South play to finish in a tie for third place.

Schedule

Source: Schedule

Game summaries

East Tennessee State

Point

@ Duquesne

@ Furman

Missouri S&T

Liberty

@ Gardner–Webb

@ Monmouth

Clark Atlanta

Presbyterian

@ Charleston Southern

Ranking movements

References

Kennesaw State
Kennesaw State Owls football seasons
Kennesaw State Owls football